Guadalupe Creek is the name of several streams:

California
 Guadalupe Valley Creek, a tributary of San Francisco Bay in San Mateo County
 Guadalupe Creek (Santa Clara County), a tributary of the Guadalupe River in Santa Clara County